William Mark Newton (born March 17, 1960) is an American politician from Georgia. Newton is a Republican member of Georgia House of Representatives for District 123.

Biography
Newton was born and raised in Macon, Georgia.  He is an emergency physician and has been CEO of MedNow Urgent Care Centers. His father, William R. newton, was a pediatrician.

References

External links 
 Mark Newton at votesmart.org

Republican Party members of the Georgia House of Representatives
21st-century American politicians
Living people
1960 births
University of Georgia alumni
Harvard School of Public Health alumni
Medical College of Georgia alumni
American health care chief executives
American emergency physicians
People from Macon, Georgia